Bururi is a city located in southern Burundi. It is the capital city of Bururi Province and has around 20.000 inhabitants in 2007.

History
On 29 April 1972, a massacre took place here. Local Hutu gendarmes in Bururi drove out military and civil government control of the Tutsi military regime of Micombero. A republic was declared, and a week later suppressed by Burundian troops.

References

Populated places in Bururi Province